Raluca Antonia Udroiu (born 12 May 1982 in Baia Mare, Maramureş, Romania) is an international backstroke swimmer from Romania, who represented her native country at the 2000 Summer Olympics in Sydney, Australia. Prior to that tournament, at the 2000 European Aquatics Championships in Helsinki, Finland, she was on the women's relay team, that won the bronze medal in the 4×100 m freestyle.

External links
 Profile on Romanian Olympic Committee

1982 births
Living people
Sportspeople from Baia Mare
Olympic swimmers of Romania
Romanian female freestyle swimmers
Swimmers at the 2000 Summer Olympics
Romanian female backstroke swimmers
European Aquatics Championships medalists in swimming